The Abyssinian woodpecker (Dendropicos abyssinicus), also known as the golden-backed woodpecker or the golden-mantled woodpecker, is a species of bird in the woodpecker family, Picidae. It is native to Africa, where it occurs in Eritrea and Ethiopia. It appears to be a close relative of the cardinal woodpecker Dendropicos fuscescens.

Description
The Abyssinian woodpecker is a very small woodpecker with a relatively long and broad bill. It has a golden yellow back and mantle with a bright red rump and barred wings and barred tail, the underparts are pale and heavily streaked with black. The head is striped and the male is distinguished by having a red nape and crown. The brown stripe through the eye and the golden mantle separate this species from the related Cardinal Woodpecker. It measured  in length and weighs .

Distribution and habitat
The Abyssinian woodpecker is endemic to the Ethiopian Highlands. It occurs north, up to central Eritrea and the Degua Tembien mountains in Ethiopia, and east to Harar in Ethiopia and the River Alata, a tributary of the Hanger River.

It has also been found in wooded savanna at lower altitudes.

Habits
The biology and ecology of the Abyssinian woodpecker is almost unknown. It is an unobtrusive bird which probes for food among moss growing on trees. It is thought that the nesting period probably runs between December and May.

Conservation status
The Abyssinian woodpecker has a very large range, and hence does not approach the thresholds for Vulnerable and is currently classed as Least Concern but it is thought to be decreasing in population and contracting its range due to continuing clearance of woodlands.

References 

Abyssinian woodpecker
Birds of the Horn of Africa
Abyssinian woodpecker
Taxonomy articles created by Polbot